Lawrence Anderson "Fish" Markham (12 September 1924 – 5 August 2000) was a South African cricketer who played in one Test in 1949.

Markham was a right-arm leg-break bowler and a right-handed lower-order batsman. His single Test was the fourth match of the 1948–49 England tour series and he was the third spin bowler alongside Tufty Mann and Athol Rowan. He scored 20 in his single innings and took just one wicket in the game and was dropped for the next match.

He played first-class cricket for Natal from 1946 to 1950. His best figures were 7 for 106 against Western Province in the 1947–48 Currie Cup. His highest score was 134, batting at number nine against Orange Free State a few weeks later, when he went to the wicket at 166 for 7 and added 174 for the eighth wicket with Ossie Dawson; he then took three wickets in each innings to give Natal an innings victory.

He is the only Test cricketer to be born in Swaziland.

See also
List of Test cricketers born in non-Test playing nations

References

External links
 
 

1924 births
2000 deaths
People from Mbabane
South Africa Test cricketers
South African cricketers
KwaZulu-Natal cricketers